Ruth's Hospitality Group is a restaurant company with a focus on American steakhouse restaurants.

The group was rebranded in May 2008, shortly after Ruth's Chris Steak House acquired the Mitchell's Fish Market and Columbus Fish Market brands from Cameron Mitchell Restaurants. The company was rebranded with a new name by CEO Mike McDonnell to reflect the wider diversity of restaurants in its portfolio. The company resold the MFM restaurant chain in 2014 for $10m to Landry's.

History 

The period immediately after the acquisition of the Mitchell's restaurants in February 2008 was turbulent, and resulted in the ousting of CEO Craig Miller, who was replaced by Mike O'Donnell in April 2008. In 2009, RHGI reported declining revenues at both the Ruth's Chris and the Mitchell's brands, with a drop of 22% in Q2 2009. By 2010, O'Donnell had begun to reverse the decline, and in 2011, he was able to report an increase of 9.2% in revenue for Ruth's Chris, and a decrease of just 2% for Mitchell's. Overall revenues rose by $15.9m to $353.6m. In a statement to shareholders, he attributed this to their growing success in private dining and catering facilities, as well as improved services for business customers.

In February 2013, RHGI reported a rise in revenues of 7.9% to $398.6 million in 2012 compared to $369.6 million in the prior year. They noted that 4th quarter sales at Ruth's Chris restaurants were up by 7.0% on the previous year, representing the 11th consecutive quarterly increase in sales and 20% growth over three years. The Mitchell's brands showed an increase of 5.2% over the previous year.

RHGI continued to add new restaurants to the Ruth's Chris chain, including in Harrah's casino in Las Vegas in January 2013, after the previous Las Vegas location on Flamingo closed in 2009. The company has announced plans for 2013 that include expanding the Ruth's Chris brand into China, a new Ruth's restaurant in Denver, CO, and four or five new franchised Ruth's locations.

In 2014 the company announced the resale of its Michell's brand to concentrate on its Ruth's Chris Steak House chain.

Paycheck Protection Program 
On April 17, 2020, two subsidiaries of Ruth's Hospitality Group received $20 million in Paycheck Protection Program loans secured by the federal government.  Although the subsidiaries were eligible for these loans and planned to use them to pay their restaurant employees, there was considerable public backlash.

Most businesses are eligible if they have 500 or fewer employees in the United States, but businesses in the restaurant industry were eligible if they had 500 or fewer employees per location. Each business is allowed one loan, but each of Ruth's Hospitality Group's two subsidiaries received a loan. When applying, each business is required to certify, in good faith, that "current economic uncertainty makes this loan request necessary to support the ongoing operations of the applicant." On April 23, after the Ruth's Chris subsidiaries applied for the loans under the then-existing loan guidelines, the Small Business Administration said that it is unlikely that a publicly traded business with substantial market value and access to capital markets could be eligible for a PPP loan. Such a business would not be able to certify in good faith that the PPP loan is necessary to support its ongoing operations because of the current economic uncertainty. Businesses that had certified with questionable basis to certify had until May 7 to repay loan proceeds or else risk investigation by the Small Business Administration.

On April 24, Ruth's Hospitality Group announced it would repay the loans.

References

External links 
 

Steakhouses in the United States
Companies based in Orange County, Florida
Restaurants established in 2008
Madison Dearborn Partners companies
Restaurant chains in the United States
Companies listed on the Nasdaq
Winter Park, Florida
Restaurant groups in the United States